The Live Album is a live album by Texas-based folk singer-songwriter Robert Earl Keen. It recorded at the Sons of Hermann Hall in Dallas, TX, and released in 1988 on Sugar Hill.

Track listing
All tracks written by Robert Earl Keen, except where noted

"I Wanna Know" (Robert Earl Keen, Fred Koller) – 2:46
"The Front Porch Song" (Robert Earl Keen, Lyle Lovett) – 6:29
"Goin' Down In Style" – 3:39
"If I Were King" – 2:51
"Copenhagen" – 2:08
"I Would Change My Life" – 2:43
"Stewball" (Traditional; arranged by Robert Earl Keen) – 2:38
"I'll Go On Downtown" – 3:52
"The Bluegrass Widow" – 6:10
"Who'll Be Looking Out For Me" – 2:12

Personnel 
In the liner notes, Keen dedicates this album with the simple line, "FOR MOM AND DAD."

Musicians 
 Robert Earl Keen Jr. – vocals, acoustic guitar
 Jonathan Yudkin – fiddle, mandolin, acoustic guitar, and arrangements on "I Wanna Know", "I Would Change My Life", and "The Bluegrass Widow"
 Roy Huskey Jr. – upright bass
 Doug Hudson – harmony vocals on "I'll Go On Downtown"
 Randall Fields  – M.C.

Production 
 Produced by Jim Rooney
 Recorded live at The Sons of Hermann Hall in Dallas, Texas by Omega Audio
 Mixed by Mark Miller at Jack's Tracks in Nashville, Tennessee
 Mastered by Jim Loyd at Masterfonics, Nashville, Tennessee
 Design by Pat Johnson, Fayetteville, Texas

References

Robert Earl Keen albums
1988 live albums
Sugar Hill Records live albums